InfraWare is an American technology company that focuses on speech transcription and other technologies for machine-assisted documentation. It has many users who work in the healthcare industry. It is headquartered in Terre Haute, Indiana.

History
Nick Mahurin founded InfraWare in 1998. However, the company was not officially launched until 2003.

InfraWare published a book about back-end ASR for MTSOs in 2005.

In 2007, InfraWare received a grant from the Terre Haute Innovation Alliance, a partnership of local organizations including Indiana State University, the Rose-Hulman Institute of Technology, and the Terre Haute Economic Development Corporation.

Around 2008, InfraWare also received assistance from Indiana's 21st Century Fund project to develop the InfraWare Dictation Recognition Engine.

InfraWare received a patent for back-end speech recognition, which was titled "System and Method for Analyzing Verbal Records of Dictation Using Extracted Verbal Features" in 2016. This technology was integrated into the company’s First Draft dictation recognition service.

InfraWare began beta testing for a new dictation translation engine in 2018. The engine was developed by combining InfraWare’s 360 transcription speech recognition platform with artificial intelligence.

InfraWare made it onto the Inc. 5000 list in 2008, and has also appeared in Digital and G2.

Systems and platforms
InfraWare mainly works on SR dictation systems. InfraWare has released InfraWare Dictation, which allows users to record dictation through a smartphone, computer, or tablet. Dictation is uploaded to a web-based platform, where healthcare transcriptionists transcribe audio files.

InfraWare also provides InfraWare 360, a documentation platform that makes use of First Draft, the company’s patented speech recognition software. Back-end speech recognition generates a first draft, which is corrected by transcriptionists.

References

Software companies based in Indiana
Companies based in Terre Haute, Indiana